Fort Simpson Island Water Aerodrome  is adjacent to Fort Simpson, Northwest Territories, Canada on the Mackenzie River. It is open from mid-June until October.

See also
 List of airports in the Fort Simpson area

References

Registered aerodromes in the Dehcho Region
Seaplane bases in the Northwest Territories